Chrysocraspeda corallina is a species of moth of the  family Geometridae. It is found in North Madagascar.

The length of the forewings is 16 mm (female).
The holotype had been collected in the Massif du Tsaratanana, altitude 2500 m.

References

Sterrhinae
Moths described in 1970
Lepidoptera of Madagascar
Moths of Madagascar
Moths of Africa